Padena may refer to:
 Padena District
 Padena-ye Olya Rural District
 Padena-ye Sofla Rural District
 Padena-ye Vosta Rural District